Craig is an unincorporated community and census-designated place (CDP) in Lewis and Clark County, Montana, United States. As of the 2010 census, the population was 43.

Demographics

Education
Headquartered in Cascade, Cascade Public Schools educates students from kindergarten through 12th grade. It also serves the nearby towns of Ulm and Wolf Creek.

References

Unincorporated communities in Lewis and Clark County, Montana
Unincorporated communities in Montana
Census-designated places in Montana